Pseudobaris is a genus of flower weevils in the beetle family Curculionidae. There are at least 100 described species in Pseudobaris.

See also
 List of Pseudobaris species

References

Further reading

 
 
 

Baridinae
Articles created by Qbugbot